Georgios Azoidis (born 6 May 1993) is a Greek judoka.

He is the bronze medallist of the 2019 European Games in the -73 kg category.

References

External links
 

1993 births
Living people
Greek male judoka
Judoka at the 2015 European Games
Judoka at the 2019 European Games
European Games medalists in judo
European Games bronze medalists for Greece
21st-century Greek people